Stacksteads railway station served Stacksteads near Bacup, Rossendale, Lancashire, England from 1852 until the line closed in 1966. The station was just to the west of Blackwood Road, with the island platform spanning the River Irwell.

Overview
The station was opened on 1 October 1852. It had an island platform providing train services to Bacup and Manchester.

Route

References

Lost Railways of Lancashire by Gordon Suggitt

Disused railway stations in the Borough of Rossendale
Former Lancashire and Yorkshire Railway stations
Railway stations in Great Britain opened in 1852
Railway stations in Great Britain closed in 1966
Beeching closures in England
1852 establishments in England